Alison Jane Sinclair  is professor of molecular virology at the University of Sussex where she runs the Sinclair Lab. Her research interests include the Epstein Barr virus. She is a fellow of the Royal Society of Biology and a senior fellow of the Higher Education Academy.

References

External links 

Living people
Women virologists
British virologists
Academics of the University of Sussex
Alumni of University College London
Year of birth missing (living people)
Fellows of the Royal Society of Biology
Senior Fellows of the Higher Education Academy